Plasmodium lucens is a parasite of the genus Plasmodium subgenus Novyella. As in all Plasmodium species, P. lucens has both vertebrate and insect hosts. The vertebrate hosts for this parasite are birds.

Taxonomy
The parasite was first described by Valkiūnas et al. in 2008.

Distribution
This parasite is found in West Africa.

Vectors
Not known.

Hosts
P. lucens infects the olive sunbird (Cyanomitra olivacea).

References

lucens
Parasites of birds